Stade Louis Dugauguez is a multi-use stadium in Sedan, France. It is currently used mostly for football matches and is the home stadium of CS Sedan Ardennes. The stadium holds 23,189 people and was built in 2000.  It replaced Stade Emile Albeau.

References

Louis Dugauguez
Sports venues in Ardennes (department)
Sports venues completed in 2000
2000 establishments in France
CS Sedan Ardennes
21st-century architecture in France